The University of Las Tunas (ULT) is a public university located in Las Tunas, Cuba. It was founded in 2009 and is organized in 4 Faculties.

Organization
There are four faculties:

 Faculty of Economic Sciences
 Faculty of Technical sciences
 Faculty of Agricultural Sciences
 Faculty of Social Sciences and Humanities

See also 

Education in Cuba
List of colleges and universities in Cuba
 Las Tunas

References

External links
  

Las Tunas
Educational institutions established in 2009
Buildings and structures in Las Tunas Province
2009 establishments in Cuba
21st-century architecture in Cuba